Uri is a given name for males. Notable people named Uri include:

 Uri Adelman (1958–2004), Israeli writer
 Uri Alon (born 1969), Israeli biologist and professor
 Uri Amit (1934–2011), 3rd mayor of Ramat Gan
 Uri Ariel (born 1952), Israeli politician
 Uri Aviram (born 1936), Israeli professor
 Uri Avnery (1923–2018), Israeli writer and peace activist
 Uri Barbash (born 1946), Israeli film director
 Uri Benjamin (born 1954), Israeli footballer
 Uri Bergman (born 1953), Israeli Paralympic swimming champion
 Urie Bronfenbrenner (1917–2005), American psychologist
 Uri Caine (born 1956), American jazz pianist
 Uri Cohen-Mintz (born 1973), Israeli basketball player
 Uri Coronel (1946–2016), Dutch sports director (AFC Ajax)
 Uri Dadush, French economist, World Bank director
 Uri Davis (born 1943), Israeli/Palestinian academic and activist
 Uri Gallin (1928–2021), Israeli Olympic discus thrower
 Uri Geller (born 1946), Israeli magician and psychic
 Uri Nissan Gnessin (1879–1913), Russian Hebrew-language writer
 Uri Gordon (born 1976), Israeli activist and author
 Uri Zvi Greenberg (1896–1981), Israeli poet and journalist
 Uri Harkham, American businessman
 Uri Kokia (born 1981), Israeli basketball player and coach
 Uri Lupolianski (born 1951), Israeli mayor of Jerusalem from 2003 to 2008
 Uri Magbo (born 1987), Israeli footballer
 Uri Maklev (born 1957), Israeli politician
 Uri Malmilian (born 1957), Israeli football manager and former player
 Uri Orbach (1960–2015), Israeli writer, journalist and politician
 Uri Orlev (born 1931), Israeli author
 Uri Rosenthal (born 1945), Dutch foreign minister
 Uri Sagi (born 1943), Israeli general
 Uri Savir (born 1953), Israeli diplomat
 Uri Shoham (born 1948), judge on the Supreme Court of Israel and brigadier-general
 Uri Shulevitz (born 1935), American author and illustrator
Uri Sivan (born 1955), Israeli physicist, professor, and President of the Technion – Israel Institute of Technology
 Uri Tracy (1764–1838), American politician
 Uri Tzaig (born 1965), Israeli multimedia artist
 Uri Zohar (born 1935), Israeli film director, actor and comedian who became a rabbi

Hebrew masculine given names